South Water Caye Marine Reserve is the largest marine reserve in the Stann Creek district of Belize.

It includes the crown reserve of Man-O-War Caye, a nesting site for the brown booby and magnificent frigatebird.

In 2017, National Geographic named Pelican Beach on South Water Caye one of the 21 best beaches in the world.

References

External links
Official website

Nature conservation in Belize
Marine reserves
Protected areas of Belize
Protected areas established in 1996
Mesoamerican Barrier Reef System